Cut Bank station is a train station in Cut Bank, Montana. It is served by Amtrak's Empire Builder, and is an important regional railway freight yard for BNSF Railway, which operates several grain collection elevators in the yard. The station site is owned by Amtrak, while the adjacent yard, trackage and signals are owned by BNSF Railway. The station is less than a mile from Cut Bank Creek gorge, which gives the county seat, station, and yard their names.

The city, in conjunction with Amtrak and current track owner BNSF Railway, recently repainted their historic train station into the traditional Great Northern Railway depot colors. The Great Northern was the original owner of the station and tracks.

References

External links 

Cut Bank station – USA RailGuide (TrainWeb)

Amtrak stations in Montana
Buildings and structures in Glacier County, Montana
Transportation in Glacier County, Montana
Former Great Northern Railway (U.S.) stations
Railway stations in the United States opened in 1893
1893 establishments in Montana